Rossana is a feminine Italian given name. Notable people with the name include:

Rossana Casale (born 1959), Italian singer
Rossana Podestà (1934–2013), Italian film actress
Rossana Lombardo (born 1962), Italian sprinter
Rossana Martini (1926–1988), Italian actress, model and beauty pageant winner
Rossana Morabito (born 1969), Italian sprinter

See also
Rosanna (disambiguation)
Rossano (given name)

Italian feminine given names